The Chamaesiphonaceae are a family of cyanobacteria.

References

Cyanobacteria families
Synechococcales